Pasco is a city in, and the county seat of, Franklin County, Washington, United States. It had a population of 59,781 at the 2010 census, and 75,432 as of the July 1, 2019 Census Bureau estimate.

Pasco is one of three cities (the others being Kennewick and Richland) that make up Washington state's Tri-Cities region, a mid-sized metropolitan area of approximately 296,224 people.

History

On October 16, 1805, the Lewis and Clark Expedition camped in the Pasco area, at a site now commemorated by Sacajawea State Park. The area was frequented by fur trappers and gold traders. In the 1880s, the Northern Pacific Railway was built near the Columbia River, bringing many settlers to the area. Pasco was officially incorporated on September 3, 1891. It was named by Virgil Bogue, a construction engineer for the Northern Pacific Railway after Cerro de Pasco, a city in the Peruvian Andes, where he had helped build a railroad. In its early years Pasco was a small railroad town, but the completion of the Grand Coulee Dam in 1941 brought irrigation and agriculture to the area.

Due largely to the presence of the Hanford Site (which made the plutonium for the "Fat Man" nuclear bomb used on Nagasaki in 1945), the entire Tri-Cities area grew rapidly from the 1940s through 1950s. However, most of the population influx resided in Richland and Kennewick, as Pasco remained primarily driven by the agricultural industry, and to a lesser degree the NP Pasco rail yards.  After the end of World War II, the entire region went through several "boom" and "bust" periods, cycling approximately every 10 years and heavily based on available government funding for Hanford-related work.  Farming continues to be the economic driver for most of the city's industrial tax base.

Pasco was not a sundown town in the same way as Richland and Kennewick, however Jim Crow laws restricted African Americans to living only on the east side of the railroad tracks, which was largely underdeveloped without public water or garbage service. In the 1940s, Edward R. Dudley visited as an investigator from the NAACP and observed widespread discrimination from businesses and law enforcement. In a 1947 survey, black residents listed water supply and service as the most significant problem for the area, and racial discrimination as second. White residents listed over-crowded schools as the most significant problem, and the presence of blacks as second. In 1948, Hazel Scott was refused service at a Pasco restaurant and successfully sued the owners for discrimination, bringing national attention to racial segregation practices in the Tri-Cities.

Pasco completed one of its largest annexations, comprising  to the northwest, in August 1982 amid a legal dispute with neighboring Richland that was decided by the Washington Supreme Court. In the late 1990s, foreseeing another Hanford-related boom period, several developers purchased large farm circles in Pasco for residential and commercial development.  Since that time, Pasco has undergone a transformation that has not only seen its population overtake the neighboring city of Richland, but also has resulted in growth in the city's retail and tourism industries. Recently incorporated land on the West side of the city has exploded into new housing tracts, apartments, and shopping centers. This area of the city has become referred to locally as "West Pasco", distinguishing it from the older area of town to the East.  In addition to an influx of new residents to the region, many residents of the Tri-Cities have moved from Richland and Kennewick to West Pasco due to its central location and virtually all-new housing and business. In early 2018, plans were announced for 5,000 to 8,000 new residences in West Pasco, west of Road 100.

Geography and climate
Pasco is located at  (46.238507, −119.108534).

As Pasco is located in Southeastern Washington, the city lies in the rain shadow of the Cascade Range. As a result, the area is a windswept desert, receiving little precipitation throughout the year. Hot summers, warm springs, and cold winters provide a stark contrast to other areas of the state.

The Columbia River borders the south side of the city, separating it from the neighboring cities of Richland and Kennewick.

Demographics

2010 census
As of the census of 2010, there were 59,781 people, 17,983 households, and 13,863 families living in the city. The racial makeup of the city was 55.8% White, 1.9% African American, 0.5% Native American, 1.9% Asian, 0.1% Pacific Islander, 36.4% from other races, and 3.3% from two or more races. Hispanic or Latino of any race were 55.7% of the population.

There were 17,983 households, of which 51.3% had children under the age of 18 living with them, 55.1% were married couples living together, 14.9% had a female householder with no husband present, 7.1% had a male householder with no wife present, and 22.9% were non-families. 17.0% of all households were made up of individuals, and 5.3% had someone living alone who was 65 years of age or older. The average household size was 3.30 and the average family size was 3.73.

The median age in the city was 27.3 years. 35.5% of residents were under the age of 18; 10.6% were between the ages of 18 and 24; 29.9% were from 25 to 44; 17.2% were from 45 to 64; and 6.7% were 65 years of age or older. The gender makeup of the city was 50.7% male and 49.3% female.

2000 census
As of the census of 2000, there were 32,066 people, 9,619 households, and 7,262 families living in the city. The population density was 1,141.9 people per square mile (440.9/km2). There were 10,341 housing units at an average density of 368.2 per square mile (142.2/km2). The racial makeup of the city was 52.76% White, 3.22% African American, 0.77% Native American, 1.77% Asian, 0.14% Pacific Islander, 37.44% from other races, and 3.9% from two or more races. Hispanic or Latino of any race was 56.26% of the population.

There were 9,619 households, out of which 45.6% had children under the age of 18 living with them, 54.7% were married couples living together, 14.3% had a female householder with no husband present, and 24.5% were non-families.  20.1% of all households were made up of individuals, and 8.5% had someone living alone who was 65 years of age or older. The average household size was 3.30 and the average family size was 3.79.

In the city, the age distribution of the population shows 35.5% under the age of 18, 11.8% from 18 to 24, 28.5% from 25 to 44, 15.5% from 45 to 64, and 8.7% who were 65 years of age or older. The median age was 27 years. For every 100 females, there were 106.7 males. For every 100 females age 18 and over, there were 104.2 males.

The median income for a household in the city was $34,540, and the median income for a family was $37,342.  Males had a median income of $29,016 versus $22,186 for females.  The per capita income for the city was $13,404. About 19.5% of families and 23.3% of the population were below the poverty line, including 31.4% of those under age 18 and 9.6% of those age 65 or over.

Government
Pasco has a council-manager government with an elected body of 7 council members, 6 of whom are from specific districts within the city, and 1 elected at-large.  The council biennially elects from its own members a mayor that runs meetings, signs certain documents, and acts in ceremonial capacity; and a mayor pro-tem that acts in the mayor's absence.  The city manager is chosen by the council as a professional administrator and runs day-to-day operations of the city including management of staff. Council members are part-time legislators.  Those elected 2017 and after receive $1,115 per month and the mayor receives $1,450 a month.

The city also has a number of advisory boards appointed by the council and includes citizen volunteers that give their time and expertise in dealing with issues including parks, senior citizen issues, planning, code enforcement, etc.

Economy

Due to the agricultural region in which it sits, several large food processing companies have a presence in the city of Pasco: Lamb Weston, Reser's Fine Foods, and Twin City Foods. In recent years, the region has become a major player in Washington state's booming wine industry. Gordon Brothers Cellars, Fidelitas Winery, Kamiak Vineyards, and Preston Premium Wines are a few of the local wineries.

Pasco is home to the Tri-Cities Airport, a regional commercial and private airport served by several airlines with direct flights to 10 US cities: Burbank, Denver, Las Vegas, Los Angeles, Minneapolis, Phoenix, Salt Lake City, San Francisco, San Diego and Seattle.

Amtrak has operated a station in Pasco since 1971, when they took over the Empire Builder from the Burlington Northern Railroad after they operated it for a short period of time. Before this, the Northern Pacific operated passenger trains through Pasco.

Additional commercial transportation is undertaken through extensive barge traffic on the Columbia and Snake rivers. Rail transport is provided by the BNSF Railway. Trucking uses Interstate 182, and to a lesser extent U.S. Route 395.

Some of Pasco's largest employers include Hanford nuclear facility, BNSF Railway, Lamb Weston, Boise Cascade, Tyson Foods, Energy Northwest, Fluor Hanford Inc., Bechtel National Inc., and Pacific Northwest National Laboratory currently managed by Battelle Memorial Institute

Education

Pasco is served by the Pasco School District, Columbia Basin College, and Washington State University Tri-Cities.

Pasco High School is the older of the city's two public high schools, and was the largest in the state before Chiawana was built. The city's second high school—Chiawana High School—opened in August 2009. Chiawana, along with Pasco High, are both one of the largest high schools in Washington State. The Pasco Bulldog school colors are purple and white; the Chiawana Riverhawk school colors are navy blue and silver.  In spring 2015, Delta High School (or DHS) opened in Pasco. It provides a STEM-based curriculum for students in grades 9–12 from three school districts in the Tri-Cities area. The school is operated as a collaborative effort by the Kennewick School District, Pasco School District, and Richland School District, and in partnerships with a local skill center, colleges, and businesses. The school has been designated by the state as an Existing Innovative School.

Privately, Pasco and the greater Tri-Cities area is served by Tri-Cities Prep, a Catholic high school off of Road 100, and St. Patrick's grade school next door to the campus of Pasco High School.

With a rapidly growing campus, Columbia Basin College is the largest public two-year community college in Southeastern Washington with a student body of nearly 7,000 students. The college was founded in 1955 and serves students from the entire Tri-Cities region.

There are four middle schools in Pasco, serving students ranging from grade six to eight. The easternmost school is Ellen Ochoa Middle School, the westernmost is John McLoughlin Middle School, the one in the central part of town is Isaac Stevens Middle School, and the one in the north-west is Ray Reynolds Middle School.

The school district has 18 elementary schools.

Recreation 
 

Among all of Pasco's annual activities and events, the most popular is the Pasco Farmers Market, located in downtown Pasco. The market is open from May through October each year, drawing a large regional crowd and providing an outlet for farmers selling fresh produce.

The Fiery Foods Festival is another popular event held each September.  This one-day event celebrates spicy foods of all varieties, and highlights the thriving Hispanic culture in the city.

Pasco's Gesa Stadium hosts the Tri-City Dust Devils, a minor league baseball team playing in the Northwest League and affiliated with the Los Angeles Angels.

The Pasco School District's renovated Edgar Brown Memorial Stadium, constructed in a former gravel pit used in the construction of the Blue Bridge (Pioneer Memorial Bridge), provides a unique venue for outdoor athletic events.

Pasco is located along a major stretch of the 22-mile Sacagawea Heritage Trail, an interactive educational and recreational hiking/cycling loop that circles the Tri-Cities area.

Pasco has several waterfront parks along the Columbia River, as well as easy river access for boaters, fishers, and skiers at any of the free boat launches.

The HAPO Center (formerly the TRAC) is a large complex located in Pasco which hosts regional events, including (but not limited to) conventions, meetings, sporting events, and concerts. The HAPO Center is located near the booming Road 68 corridor in Pasco.

Transportation

 Pasco Intermodal Train Station, a stop on Amtrak's Empire Builder, with daily service with its southwest-bound section heading to Portland. Eastbound, it heads to Spokane, St. Paul, and Chicago with many intermediate points. (The train's other section goes from Spokane to Seattle.)

 Tri-Cities Airport, with commercial service to Burbank, Denver, Las Vegas, Los Angeles, Minneapolis-St. Paul, Phoenix, Salt Lake City, San Francisco, Seattle-Tacoma. 

 Ben Franklin Transit

Notable people
 
 Jeremy Bonderman, Major League Baseball pitcher, pitched for Detroit Tigers in 2006 World Series
 Kathy Brock, Chicago television journalist
 Arthur Fletcher, black Pasco council member in 1967, founded local "Self-Help Cooperative". Head of the United Negro College Fund and coined term, "A mind is a terrible thing to waste."
 S. T. Gordon, world Cruiserweight boxing champion
 Doc Hastings, retired United States Congressman
 James Wong Howe, Academy Award-winning cinematographer
 Michael Jackson, Seattle Seahawks linebacker
 Bruce Kison, MLB pitcher, two-time World Series champion
 Chuck Palahniuk, novelist
 Jeannie Russell, "Margaret Wade" in Dennis the Menace TV series
 Joseph Santos, artist/painter (Pasco High School graduate)
 Ron Silliman, poet
 Brian Urlacher, NFL player, Pro Bowl linebacker for Chicago Bears
 Kristine W, (Weitz) singer/songwriter, former Miss Washington
 Ray Washburn, Major League Baseball pitcher, two-time World Series champion
 Maris Wrixon, film actress

References

External links

 City of Pasco website
 Pasco Chamber of Commerce
 Franklin County Historical Society
 Pasco's African American History
 Pasco Branch at MidColumbiaLibraries.org
 Tri-City Herald newspaper
 Tri-City Regional Chamber of Commerce
 Washington State Office of Financial Management
 Pasco School District website

 
Cities in Franklin County, Washington
Cities in Washington (state)
 
World War II Heritage Cities
County seats in Washington (state)
Washington (state) populated places on the Columbia River
Superfund sites in Washington (state)
1891 establishments in Washington (state)
Populated places established in 1891